Marco Mapelli (born 1 August 1987 in Seregno, Italy) is an Italian Factory Driver employed with Lamborghini.

Career

Racing Record

Complete WeatherTech SportsCar Championship results
(key) (Races in bold indicate pole position; results in italics indicate fastest lap)

References

https://www.driverdb.com/drivers/marco-mapelli/
http://www.marcomapelli.net/

1987 births
Living people
Italian racing drivers
24 Hours of Daytona drivers
24H Series drivers
British GT Championship drivers
Blancpain Endurance Series drivers
ADAC GT Masters drivers
WeatherTech SportsCar Championship drivers
Italian Formula Renault 1.6 drivers
Italian Formula Renault 2.0 drivers
Audi Sport drivers
RP Motorsport drivers
Phoenix Racing drivers
AF Corse drivers
International GT Open drivers
Nürburgring 24 Hours drivers
Asian Le Mans Series drivers
Lamborghini Squadra Corse drivers
US RaceTronics drivers